Bromelioideae is a subfamily of the bromeliads (Bromeliaceae). This subfamily is the most diverse, represented by the greatest number of genera with about 40. Most of the plants in this group are epiphytes, though some have evolved in, or will adapt to, terrestrial conditions. This subfamily features the most plant types which are commonly cultivated by people, including the pineapple.


Description

The foliage in most bromelioids grows to form a rosette where water is caught and stored. Their leaves are usually spined and they produce berry-like fruits in their blooms. These plants contain an inferior ovary.

Genera 
, the Encyclopaedia of Bromeliads listed 39 genera, plus one hybrid genus (×Hohenmea B.R.Silva & L.F.Sousa) and one genus with no species listed, that Plants of the World Online treated as an artificial hybrid genus (×Cryptbergia R.G.Wilson & C.L.Wilson). A further genus, Hylaeaicum, was separated from Neoregelia in 2021.

References

 BSI - Bromeliad Info - Taxonomy
 Bromeliads
 LUTHER, H. E. (2008) An Alphabetical List of Bromeliad Binomials, Eleventh Edition The Marie Selby Botanical Gardens, Sarasota, Florida, USA. Published by The Bromeliad Society International.

 
Commelinid subfamilies